Eric Oren (February 11, 1868 – July 11, 1937) was an American businessman and politician.

Oren emigrated to the United States from Norway and settled in Wells, Faribault County, Minnesota with his wife and family. He was involved with the banking and railroad businesses and was a merchant and photographer. Oren served in the Minnesota House of Representatives from 1919 to 1924. He also served as the mayor and clerk of Wells, Minnesota. Oren also served on the Wells School Board.

References

1868 births
1937 deaths
Norwegian emigrants to the United States
People from Wells, Minnesota
Businesspeople from Minnesota
Mayors of places in Minnesota
School board members in Minnesota
Members of the Minnesota House of Representatives